The 1972–73 WHA season was the first season of the World Hockey Association (WHA). Twelve teams played 78 games each. The league was officially incorporated in June of 1971 by Gary Davidson and Dennis A. Murphy and promised to ice twelve teams in various markets around Canada and the United States. The league championship trophy, the Avco World Trophy, was donated by AVCO Financial Services Corporation along with $500,000. The New England Whalers won the first Avco World Trophy.

1972 General Player Draft

The WHA's inaugural player draft was held in Anaheim, California on February 12 and 13, 1972. All 12 WHA franchises took part in the draft. There were no drafting constraints, and the WHA teams selected players from all levels of play, including established National Hockey League players, minor leaguers, college, junior players, Europeans, and even retired players. The first player selected in the general draft was United States men's national ice hockey team member Henry Boucha, taken by the Minnesota Fighting Saints (who also selected the Governor of Minnesota, Wendell Anderson, with a late pick). After 70 rounds the Winnipeg Jets selected Soviet premier Alexei Kosygin and then stopped participating in the draft, while the other teams continued making selections. This process continued, with teams arbitrarily dropping out from the draft, while others kept going, until attrition finally ended the process.  The final two teams participating in this draft were the Dayton Aeros and the Los Angeles Sharks. In all, just under 1100 selections were made by the 12 teams, who could now focus their efforts on signing players for the first season of play.

Regular season summary
The first WHA games, on October 11, 1972, were won by the Alberta Oilers 7-4 over the Ottawa Nationals and the Cleveland Crusaders 2-0 over the Quebec Nordiques.

The WHA was split into two divisions, the Eastern Division and the Western Division. Each division sported six teams. The New England Whalers led the Eastern Division and had the best record in the league. The other playoff qualifiers in the East were Cleveland, Philadelphia, and Ottawa. The Winnipeg Jets led the Western Division and had the second best record in the league. Behind Winnipeg, the West had a thrilling race with four teams fighting for three playoff spots, trading second through fifth place all season. Houston won three of its last four games to finish second with 82 points. With two games remaining, Minnesota had 79 points, Alberta had 77, and Los Angeles had 76. Los Angeles won their last two games to finish third, while Minnesota and Alberta both lost their next to last game of the season, setting up a final game showdown in Minnesota against each other with Minnesota two points ahead of Alberta. Alberta won the game 5-3, so both teams finished with identical records.  The league now faced a dilemma. The first standings tiebreaker was number of wins, and the teams both had 38. The second tiebreaker was head-to-head record and the teams split their eight games with four wins apiece. The league by-laws did not specify further tiebreakers. In the NHL, the next two tie breakers were goal differential and goals scored, both of which favored Alberta. But because the WHA by-laws did not specify additional tiebreakers, the league Board of Governors met to decide how to break the tie. They ultimately decided on a 1-game playoff at a neutral site.  The Alberta Oilers missed the playoffs, despite having a superior goal-differential to the Minnesota Fighting Saints, because they lost the neutral-site, tie-breaking game against the Saints in Calgary by a score of 4-2.

Final standings
GP = Games Played, W = Wins, L = Losses, T = Ties, Pts = Points, GF = Goals for, GA = Goals against, PIM = Penalties in minutes

Teams that qualifies for the playoffs are highlighted in bold

Player stats

Scoring leaders
Bolded numbers indicate season leaders

GP = Games played; G = Goals; A = Assists; Pts = Points; PIM = Penalty minutes

Leading goaltenders 
Bolded numbers indicate season leaders

GP = Games played; Min = Minutes played; W = Wins; L = Losses; T = Ties, GA = Goals against; GA = Goals against; SO = Shutouts; SV% = Save percentage; GAA = Goals against average

All-star game

The WHA held its first all-star game on January 6, 1973, in Quebec City. The attendance of 5,435 was lower than expected, perhaps because it was locally televised and Quebec City was hit by a major snow storm. The East defeated the West 6-2. Wayne Carleton of the Ottawa Nationals was named the game MVP.

During the all-star break, the WHA Players' Association was officially formed, with Curt Leichner of Portland as general counsel and Bill Hicke of the Alberta Oilers as president.

Playoff summary
Compared to the thrilling race in the West Division, the playoffs were unexciting in that the team with the better record won every series and only one series went beyond 5 games. That was the West semifinal between Houston and Los Angeles. After getting blown out in game one in Houston by a score of 7-2, Los Angeles rallied to win game two 4-2 and even the series. The Sharks then won a thrilling game three in L.A. 3-2. Game 4 was the turning point of the series. The teams headed into overtime tied at 2; a Houston goal would even the series while a Los Angeles goal would give the Sharks a commanding 3-1 series lead. The Aeros scored in overtime to even the series, then won game 5 in Houston, 6-3. Game six in L.A. was another thriller, with Houston scoring in the final minutes to win the game 3-2 and win the series.

Avco World Trophy playoffs

Avco World Trophy finals
New England Whalers defeated the Winnipeg Jets, 4 games to 1. The Whalers defeated the Jets 9 to 6 in the deciding game in Boston on May 6, 1973, with Larry Pleau scoring a hat trick. Upon their win, The Avco World Trophy had not yet been completed. As a result, the Whalers skated their victory lap with their divisional trophy.

WHA awards

Trophies

All-Star Team

Debuts
The following is a list of players of note who played their first major professional game in 1972–73 (listed with their first team, asterisk(*) marks debut in playoffs):

Mike Antonovich, Minnesota Fighting Saints
Richard Brodeur, Quebec Nordiques
Gavin Kirk, Ottawa Nationals
Bruce Landon, New England Whalers
Bob MacMillan, Minnesota Fighting Saints
Rusty Patenaude, Alberta Oilers
Gene Peacosh, New York Raiders
Ron Plumb, Philadelphia Blazers
Tim Sheehy, New England Whalers

Last game
The following is a list of players of note who played their final major professional game in 1972–73:

Kent Douglas, New York Raiders
Bill Hicke, Alberta Oilers
Marcel Paille, Philadelphia Blazers

See also
1972–73 WHA All-Star Game
1972–73 NHL season
1972 in sports
1973 in sports

References
 
HockeyDB

 
2
2
World Hockey Association seasons